Setripn' Bloccstyle is the debut album by Sacramento rapper Mr. Doctor. It was presented by and features Brotha Lynch Hung. It was released on CD and cassette tape.

Track listing

References

External links

Brotha Lynch Hung albums
Horrorcore albums
G-funk albums
Gangsta rap albums by American artists
West Coast hip hop albums
1995 albums